La Ilustración Española y Americana was a weekly Spanish magazine that was published from 1869 to 1921 on the 8th, 15th, 22nd and 30th of every month. It was also published biweekly.

History 

On its masthead, it was described as a magazine of "sciences, arts, literature, trade and useful knowledge". Three years later, the building where it was printed collapsed, killing three people, so Carlos rebuilt with a new, state-of-the-art press. He served as the magazine's Director until 1881, when management passed to his sons Abelardo and Isidro, and he died in 1884.

Among the major writers who made contributions may be numbered José Zorrilla, Ramón de Campoamor, Juan Valera, Leopoldo Alas, Ramón del Valle-Inclán and Miguel de Unamuno. It was also one of the vehicles favoured by Emilia Pardo Bazán for the publication of her short stories, in particular between 1909 and 1913. Regular political and journalistic contributors included Emilio Castelar and Manuel Cañete.

Contents 

As its name would indicate, it was profusely illustrated with scenes from daily life in Spain and Hispanic America, where it was also distributed. It became an "authentic school for masters of the graphic arts". , an engraver and brother of the painter, Martín Rico, was the Artistic Director; responsible for the magazine's design and printing.

The variety of themes encouraged specialization among the magazine's artistic contributors, such as Josep Lluís Pellicer who, like the later photojournalists of the 20th century, produced first-hand scenes from the Third Carlist War and the Russo-Turkish War. It included also the Restoration, costumbrism and realism.

The long list of regular illustrators included the painters Alejandro Ferrant, Enrique Simonet and Valeriano Bécquer, and humorous cartoonists such as Francisco Ortego Vereda. Also notable were engravings based on images by the French-born photographer Jean Laurent.

References

Further reading 
 Esperanza Cobos Castro, La poesía francesa en la Ilustración española y americana, self-published (1982)
 Blas Sierra de la Calle, Filipinas 1870-1898: imágenes de la ilustración española y americana, Caja España, 1998

External links 

 Digitalized copies @ the Biblioteca Nacional de España.
 Biblioteca Virtual Miguel de Cervantes: La Ilustración Española y Americana digitalized (1869–1901)
 Articles from La Ilustración Española y Americana digitalized as ePubs, by Ganso y Pulpo
 Antonio Ayuso Pérez. "La Ilustración Española y Americana ante el Tercer Centenario del Quijote" @ the Universidad Complutense.

1869 establishments in Spain
1921 disestablishments in Spain
Visual arts magazines
Biweekly magazines published in Spain
Defunct magazines published in Spain
General interest digests
Magazines established in 1869
Magazines disestablished in 1921
Spanish-language magazines
Weekly magazines published in Spain
Magazines published in Madrid